Days of Open Hand is the third studio album by Suzanne Vega. It was released on April 10, 1990 through A&M Records. The follow-up to the successful Solitude Standing (1987), Days of Open Hand combines Vega's established folk-rock style with more varied instrumentation such as the ney and dumbek and experimental arrangements.

The album was produced by Vega and Anton Sanko, who also co-wrote many of the album's tracks. High-profile contributors to the album include Philip Glass, Shawn Colvin, and John Linnell (of They Might Be Giants). The album saw greater use of synthesizers and samplers than Vega's previous albums; these included the Fairlight CMI and Voyetra-8.

Days of Open Hand failed to match the success of its predecessor, stalling at number 50 in the US and failing to spawn a hit single. It was more successful in the UK, where it reached the top 10. Despite this, the album did surpass sales of a million copies and reviews were generally positive. Days of Open Hand was nominated for Best Contemporary Folk Recording and won the award for Best Recording Package at the 33rd Grammy Awards.

Reception

Days of Open Hand did not achieve the sales of its predecessor upon release, but was still successful in many territories. While the album stalled at number 50 in the US, it was a top 10 hit in the UK, peaking at number 7. Additionally, it reached the top 20 in five other countries throughout Europe. "Book of Dreams", the album's first single, peaked at number 66 in the UK and number 8 on the US Modern Rock Tracks chart. However, the album's second and third singles, "Tired of Sleeping" and "Men in a War" failed to see any chart success.

Track listing

Personnel
 Suzanne Vega – vocals, acoustic guitar  backing vocals , Fairlight synthesizer 
 Anton Sanko – guitar, Hammond C3 organ, tiple, Sequential V.s., Dx711, Voyetra-8, Fairlight synthesizers, Akai S-1000 sampler, programming, string arrangement 
 Shawn Colvin – backing vocals 
 Marc Shulman – E-bow , electric guitar , tiple guitar , 12-string electric guitar , bouzouki 
 Michael Visceglia – five-string bass , fretless bass 
 Erik Sanko – fretless bass 
 Percy Jones – fretless bass 
 John Linnell – accordion 
 Richard Horowitz – ney 
 Hearn Gadbois – dumbek
 Michael Blair – marimba , metal percussion , tambourine  percussion , shaker , hand drum 
 Glen Velez – drums
 Frank Vilardi – drums , percussion , rims and brushes , Akai S-1000 sampler , percussion , shaker , snare and tom tom drums , blastics 
 Philip Glass – string arrangement 
Maria Kitsopoulos - cello 
Fred Zlotkin - cello 
Sandra Park - first violin 
Barry Finclair - violin solo 
Hae Young Ham - violin 
Timothy Baker - violin 
Rebecca Young - viola 
Alfred Brown - viola 

Production
 Bob Ludwig – mastering
 Hugh Padgham – mixing
 Pat McCarthy – engineer
 Pat Dillett – assistant engineer
 Geoff Keehn – engineer
 Jeff Lippay – assistant engineer
 Jon Goldberger – assistant engineer
 Kurt Munkasci – string engineer

Charts

Certifications

Singles

References

External links
The Album Pages fansite: Days of Open Hand link
Suzanne Vega Discography: solo albums page link

Suzanne Vega albums
1990 albums
A&M Records albums